Atwood is a small earth moon impact crater that is located on the Mare Fecunditatis, to the northwest of the prominent crater Langrenus. It forms a triple-crater formation with Naonobu attached to the north rim and Bilharz near the west rim.

Atwood lies near the edge of the outer ramparts of Langrenus, and the ejecta forms low ridges attached to the south rim of Atwood. Within the crater interior is a low central peak that joins a ridge line to the north rim of the crater.

Atwood was formerly designated Langrenus K, before being renamed by the IAU in 1976.

References

External links
 
 LTO-80A3 Lunar Topographic Orthophotomap 80A3, Bilharz

Impact craters on the Moon